Hampstead is an unincorporated community and census-designated place (CDP) in Pender County, North Carolina, United States. It is located between Wilmington and Jacksonville on U.S. Route 17 and comprises an area sized just over 20 square miles.

Hampstead is part of the Wilmington Metropolitan Statistical Area.

History
Hampstead was named after Hampstead, in England.

The Belvidere Plantation House was listed on the National Register of Historic Places in 1982.

Demographics

2020 census

As of the 2020 United States census, there were 7,016 people, 1,946 households, and 1,475 families residing in the CDP.

Schools 
There are four elementary schools, North Topsail Elementary, South Topsail Elementary, Topsail Elementary, and Surf City Elementary. There are two middle schools named Topsail Middle School and Surf City Middle School and one high school, Topsail High School, which is located right next to Topsail Middle and within walking distance of the Hampstead Branch Library.

Public services 
The Hampstead area is served by Pender EMS & Fire. Hampstead also has the Topsail Composite Squadron of the Civil Air Patrol. Hampstead is also served by the Pender County Sheriff’s Department.

See also 
 Topsail High School
 Topsail Island
 North Topsail Beach, North Carolina

References

External links 
 Hampstead Chamber of Commerce
 City-Data Information about Hampstead Area
 Hampstead NC InsiderInfo.us Area Guide
 Pender County Government Hampstead Annex

Census-designated places in Pender County, North Carolina
Census-designated places in North Carolina
Cape Fear (region)